Querent may refer to:
The person who consults a divination process
Plaintiff, the person initiating a lawsuit